Nicolás Andrés Díaz Huincales (born 20 May 1999) is a Chilean professional footballer who plays as a defender for Liga MX club Tijuana and the Chile national team.

Club career
In June 2022, he joined Club Tijuana.

International career
Díaz made his senior national team debut on 8 October 2020 in a World Cup qualifier game against Uruguay.

Personal life 
He is the son of the former Chile international Ítalo Díaz. His older brother, Paulo, is also a Chile international footballer.

Díaz Huincales is of Mapuche descent.

Honours
Palestino
 Copa Chile (1): 2018

References

1999 births
Living people
Chilean people of Mapuche descent
Footballers from Santiago
Chilean footballers
Chilean expatriate footballers
Chile international footballers
Club Deportivo Palestino footballers
Atlético Morelia players
Mazatlán F.C. footballers
Club Tijuana footballers
Chilean Primera División players
Liga MX players
Expatriate footballers in Mexico
Chilean expatriate sportspeople in Mexico
Association football defenders
Mapuche sportspeople
Indigenous sportspeople of the Americas